Thetidos is a genus of sea snails, marine gastropod mollusks in the family Raphitomidae.

Species
 † Thetidos fossilis Lozouet, 2017 
 Thetidos globulosa (Hervier, 1896)
 Thetidos madecassina Bozzetti, 2020
 Thetidos minutissima Fedosov & Stahlschmidt, 2014
 Thetidos morsura Hedley, 1899
 Thetidos pallida Fedosov & Stahlschmidt, 2014
 Thetidos puillandrei Fedosov & Stahlschmidt, 2014
 Thetidos tridentata Fedosov & Puillandre, 2012

References

External links
 Hedley, C. (1899). The Mollusca of Funafuti. Part I - Gasteropoda. Memoirs of the Australian Museum. 3(7): 395-488, pl. 27
 Fedosov, A. E.; Stahlschmidt, P. (2014). Revision of the genus Thetidos Hedley, 1899 (Gastropoda: Conoidea: Raphitomidae) in the Indo-Pacific with descriptions of three new species. Molluscan Research. 34(4): 258-273

Raphitomidae